The New England Stars were a North Eastern Hockey League (NEHL) team based in Danbury, Connecticut who started play at the end of 2006. The team filled the void when the Danbury Trashers left the Danbury Ice Arena, after the Trashers folded due to involvement in illegal business.

2006-2007 Season 
The New England Stars swept the two game championship series 2–0 to finish the season an astounding 22-0 .The Stars were by far the most successful team in the 2006–07 season, going undefeated as of March 18, 2007. Their superiority against the rest of the league was tested on March 18 when they played against an all-star team made up of the best players on the other three NEHL teams. However, they lost the game 4–3.  They finished the regular season 20–0.

See also
Professional Hockey In Connecticut

 
North Eastern Hockey League teams
Danbury, Connecticut
Tourist attractions in Fairfield County, Connecticut
Ice hockey teams in Connecticut
Ice hockey clubs established in 2006
2006 establishments in Connecticut